Khin San Win (born 8 June 1965) is a Burmese make-up artist, fashion designer, hair specialist turned actress after three decades-long experience in the Myanmar makeup industry. For decades she was known by the nickname Ma Gyi San while working as a make-up artist in Myanmar, before her acting debut. Khin San Win featured on The Myanmar Times "Top 10 Make-up artists" list in 2018.

Early life and education
Khin San Win was born on 8 June 1965 in Yangon, Myanmar, and was raised with three brothers and one sister. She favoured a female identity and was constantly misunderstood, discriminated against, abused and treated with violence, even within the family.

She attended high school at Basic Education High School No. 2 Dagon and graduated from University of Yangon.

Career

Make-up artist
At the age of 18, she learned from make-up artists Ko Toe and Sandi. When she was aged 21, she opened a hairdressing salon on 34th Street in Yangon. She offered to work for popular movie stars and made a name for herself in the make-up industry. She rose to prominence while working with actresses Htet Htet Moe Oo, Htoo Mon, Myo Thandar Htun and others, arranging their hair and changing their look. She started a dress service when in 1991.

She owns a bridal make-up and wedding dress service, teaches make-up classes and enjoys popularity amongst the country's LGBT community. She then became an actress.

Acting career
She made her acting debut with a leading role in the film Ma Gyi San and Her Lovers, alongside Htet Aung Shine and Zwe Pyae, directed by Myat Khine. The film was released in 2016.

In  2017, she starred in her second film Tanay Mhar Maung Ko De A Kyaung Tway Pyaw Pya Ya Oo Mal, alongside Aye Chan Maung, directed by Naing Myo Tun (Yangon University 
). The film was released on 27 February 2018.

In 2018, she took on her first big-screen role in comedy film Kyar Kyar Kyite Kyite, where she played the main role with Myint Myat, Min Maw Kun, Nyi Nyi Maung, Linn Linn and Ma Htet. The film was directed by Pyi Hein Thiha which premiered in Myanmar cinemas on 29 August 2019. Her portrayal of the LGBT character earned praised by fans for her acting performance and character interpretation, and experienced a resurgence of popularity.

LGBT support
Khin San Win is a supporter of the LGBT rights in Myanmar, she actively participated in many LGBT rights campaigns in Yangon. She is lobbying for the abolishing of Article 377 of Myanmar's Penal Code.

Filmography

Film (Cinema)
Kyar Kyar Kyite Kyite (ကျားကျားကြိုက်ကြိုက်) (2019)

Film
Ma Gyi San and Her Lovers (2016)
Tanay Mhar Maung Ko De A Kyaung Tway Pyaw Pya Ya Oo Mal (2018)

References

External links 
 

1965 births
Living people
People from Yangon
Burmese make-up artists
Transgender actresses
Burmese LGBT people
Burmese LGBT rights activists
University of Yangon alumni